Stephan Pilsinger (born 17 February 1987) is a German physician and politician of the Christian Social Union (CSU) who has been serving as a member of the Bundestag from the state of Bavaria since 2017.

Political career 
Pilsinger became a member of the Bundestag in the 2017 German federal election. He is a member of the Committee on Health, the Committee on Family, Senior Citizens, Women and Youth, and the Subcommittee on Civilian Crisis Prevention.

Other activities 
 German-Israeli Health Forum for Artificial Intelligence (GIHF-AI), Member of the Board of Trustees (since 2022)
 German Red Cross (DRK), Member

References

External links 

  
 Bundestag biography 

1987 births
Living people
Members of the Bundestag for Bavaria
Members of the Bundestag 2021–2025
Members of the Bundestag 2017–2021
Physicians from Munich
Members of the Bundestag for the Christian Social Union in Bavaria
Politicians from Munich